Woodbridge is an unincorporated community and census-designated place (CDP) within Woodbridge Township, in Middlesex County, New Jersey, United States. As of the 2010 United States Census, the CDP's population was 19,265. Despite the similarity in the name of the CDP and the township, the two are not coextensive; the CDP occupies 15.7% of the township's .

Geography
According to the United States Census Bureau, the CDP had a total area of 3.861 square miles (10.000 km2), including 3.846 square miles (9.962 km2) of land and 0.015 square miles (0.039 km2) of water (0.39%).

Demographics

Census 2010

Census 2000
As of the 2000 United States Census there were 18,309 people, 7,290 households, and 4,847 families living in the CDP.  The population density was 1,826.7/km2 (4,727.1/mi2).  There were 7,512 housing units at an average density of 749.5/km2 (1,939.5/mi2).  The racial makeup of the CDP was 74.44% White, 7.64% African American, 0.12% Native American, 12.85% Asian, 0.02% Pacific Islander, 2.96% from other races, and 1.97% from two or more races. Hispanic or Latino of any race were 9.84% of the population.

There were 7,290 households, out of which 29.3% had children under the age of 18 living with them, 50.9% were married couples living together, 11.8% had a female householder with no husband present, and 33.5% were non-families. 27.2% of all households were made up of individuals, and 10.9% had someone living alone who was 65 years of age or older.  The average household size was 2.49 and the average family size was 3.06.

In the CDP the population was spread out, with 21.4% under the age of 18, 7.4% from 18 to 24, 35.9% from 25 to 44, 21.5% from 45 to 64, and 13.7% who were 65 years of age or older.  The median age was 36 years. For every 100 females, there were 92.1 males.  For every 100 females age 18 and over, there were 88.0 males.

The median income for a household in the CDP was $60,594, and the median income for a family was $70,184. Males had a median income of $50,071 versus $34,928 for females. The per capita income for the CDP was $26,728.  About 3.9% of families and 5.8% of the population were below the poverty line, including 6.2% of those under age 18 and 8.0% of those age 65 or over.

See also
List of neighborhoods in Woodbridge Township, New Jersey
List of neighborhoods in Edison, New Jersey

References

Census-designated places in Middlesex County, New Jersey
Neighborhoods in Woodbridge Township, New Jersey